Antonio Lorenzoni (Montecchio Maggiore 10 June 1755 – 30 September 1840) was an Italian lawyer, jurist and music theorist.

Biography 
Antonio Lorenzoni was born to Pasino Lorenzoni and Elisabetta Sartorio in the family's country house in Montecchio Maggiore near Vicenza.

In his youth, he received a musical education, but the Saggio per ben sonare il Flautotraverso (1779) remains the only evidence of this juvenile passion, which presumably ended with the beginning of his profession as a lawyer.

Having completed the high school education in Vicenza, he enrolled in the Faculty of Law at the University of Padua, where he obtained a degree in public and private law in 1778. He then began working as a freelance lawyer at the Vicenza Bar until he was promoted in 1813 by the government of the Kingdom of Italy to Avvocato del Fisco, a position he held for thirteen years.

In 1814 he had a new villa built by Bartolomeo Malacarne in place of the house where he was born in Montecchio.

Late in life he acquired a reputation as an influential jurist, so much so that he was esteemed even beyond the borders of Italy. On his death, a municipal decree had his body moved to the Vicenza cemetery, near the tombs of the most illustrious citizens.

In 1876 the Municipality of Montecchio Maggiore erected a bust of him in the council chamber of the town hall.

Works 

 Saggio per ben sonare il Flautotraverso con alcune notizie generali ed utili per qualunque strumento, ed altre concernenti la storia della musica, Vicenza, 1779.
 Istituzioni del diritto civile privato per la Provincia Vicentina, Vicenza, 1785-86.
 Stampa in causa dell’eredità Almerico contenente: Risposta della pia Congregazione di Vicenza etc. non che delli signori Tranquillo Toaldo, Francesco dott. Rubini etc. al confronto del sig. Licinio Muzan del fu Carlo, 1817.
 Istituzioni del diritto pubblico interno pel Regno Lombardo-Veneto, Padova, 1835-39.
 Scelta di disposizioni del diritto romano, Padova, 1838.
 Saggio di logica, ossia principii fondamentali per far retto uso delle forze dell’intelletto onde discernere il vero dal falso, Padova, 1839.
 Regole ed avvertenze che in ordine al venerato dispaccio 9 Settembre 1817 dell’Aulica Camera di organizzazione in Vienna osservare si devono dal R. Fisco per l’esame delle Fidejussioni.

References

Further reading 

 Enrico Coden, Fra plagio e originalità: una lettura del Saggio di Antonio Lorenzoni, in Falaut, 21/3 (2020), pp. 27–29.
 Giovanni Da Schio, Persone memorabili in Vicenza, Vicenza, 1825-1867.
 Pietro Dal Ferro, Necrologia. L’avvocato Antonio Lorenzoni di Vicenza, Vicenza, 1840.
 Orazio Fagian, Elogio funebre che diceva in Montecchio Maggiore al dott. Antonio Lorenzoni il giorno della sua tumulazione l’Arciprete D. Orazio Fagian, Vicenza, 1840.
 Franco Alberto Gallo, Il "Saggio per ben sonare il Flautotraverso" di Antonio Lorenzoni nella cultura musicale italiana del Settecento, in La Rassegna Musicale, 31/1 (1961), pp. 103–111.
 Girolamo Gasparella, I Musicisti Vicentini, Vicenza, 1880.
 Luigi Lupo, Il "Saggio" di Antonio Lorenzoni alla luce del carteggio tra Johann Joachim Quantz e Padre Giovanni Battista Martini, in Il flauto in Italia, a cura di Claudio Paradiso, Roma, 2005.
 Pietro Marasca, Biografie degli Uomini celebri Vicentini, vol. 1, Vicenza, 1865.
 Sebastiano Rumor, Gli scrittori vicentini dei secoli decimottavo e decimonono, vol. 2, Venezia, 1907.

External links 

 Full text of the Saggio per ben sonare il Flautotraverso (Vicenza, 1779)
 Franco Alberto Gallo, Il ‘Saggio per ben sonare il flautotraverso‘ di Antonio Lorenzoni nella cultura musicale italiana del Settecento, in La Rassegna Musicale, 31/1 (1961), p. 103-111.
 Enrico Coden, Zwischen Plagiat und Originalität. Eine kritische Lektüre des Saggio von Antonio Lorenzoni, Tibia - Online-Portal für Holzbläser, 07/12/2020

Italian music theorists
19th-century Italian lawyers
19th-century Italian jurists
1755 births
1840 deaths
People from the Province of Vicenza
University of Padua alumni